Ida Gomes, stage name of Ita Szafran (Kraśnik, September 25, 1923 - Rio de Janeiro, February 22, 2009) was a Brazilian actress and voice actress born in Poland.

Biography

Gomes was born Ita Szafran to a Jewish family in Kraśnik, Poland. She spent her first 13 years in France, where her family moved in 1924. In Paris, she learned French and came into contact with 17th-century French classical dramaturgy like Racine, Corneille and Molière. Szafran emigrated to Brazil with her family in the late 1930s.

Radio
In 1938, encouraged by her mother, she participated and won a talent contest by reading a poem on Celso Guimarães' program on Rádio Tupi, being offered to sign a contract to work in radio soap operas, taking up the stage name Ida Gomes. During 20 years, she worked as a radio actress, working for Rádio Tupi, and also in Rádio Globo, where he joined the cast of Amaral Gurgel, and for Rádio Nacional, which was at the height of its programming. In 1948, she received a scholarship and moved for a year to the United States and in 1951, she went on to an internship as an announcer for BBC Radio in London.

Television
In 1953, she returned to Brazil, in 1953 and began her career in television, joining TV Tupi, where she performed at Grande Teatro Tupi, a teletheater directed by Sérgio Britto, and at Câmara Um, a series directed by Jacy Campos that staged horror stories. She also performed in the telenovelas Coração Delator (1954) and A Canção de Bernadete (1957).

Gomes moved in 1967 to TV Globo, and her first participation in the telenovelas of this network was in A Rainha Louca. She acted in several telenovelas and miniseries of the Rio TV station, playing unforgettable characters such as the elderly queen Sílvia Candiano in A Ponte dos Suspiros (1968), the unscrupulous Jandira Serrano in Verão Vermelho (1969), the amusing Mother Encarnación in Estúpido Cupido (1976), the spinster Tia Magda in O Astro (1977), the grandiose Zizi de La Rocha in Memórias de um Gigolô (1986), and others.

In 1973, she played her biggest television success: the priceless Dorotéia Cajazeira, one of the three Cajazeiras sisters (the other two sisters were played by actresses Dirce Migliaccio and Dorinha Duval), repressed spinsters, friends of the mayor of Sucupira, and who defended morality and good customs, with certain hypocrisy in O Bem-Amado, the first Brazilian telenovela in color, written by Dias Gomes and directed by Régis Cardoso; a notable feature of this telenovela was its music, composed by Vinícius de Moraes and Toquinho. The success of the telenovela was so great, that it was rebooted as a series seven years later, with Ida and the same protagonists: Paulo Gracindo, Lima Duarte, Emiliano Queiroz and Dirce Migliaccio.

Despite being Jewish, Ida was one of the actresses most known for her roles as a nun on TV. In an interview with Jô Soares on his Programa do Jô, in 2001, Ida jokingly declared when the presenter asked her a question about her multiple roles as a nun on television: "I'm Jewish, but I'm always called to play the charity sister, the Mother Superior. Globo tried to convert me but failed". Her most recent work on TV was in the first season of the miniseries JK, in which she was Sister Maria - a French nun living in Minas Gerais who helped physician Juscelino Kubitschek (played by Wagner Moura) to take care of the wounded in the military battle between the States of Minas and São Paulo.

Voice acting
Parallel to her career on TV, Gomes did voiceovers and was part of the stellar cast of Cine Castro, directed by Carla Civelli, where she dubbed alongside Nathalia Timberg, Alberto Pérez, Cláudio Corrêa e Castro, Angela Bonatti, José Miziara, Daniel Filho and Cláudio Cavalcanti. She became the official voice of Bette Davis and Joan Crawford in their main movies dubbed for the Brazilian television.

Theater
Gomes made her theatrical debut in 1957 at Teatro do Estudante, directed by Paschoal Carlos Magno, with the plays O Primo da California by Joaquim Manuel de Macedo and Catarina da Russia, alongside Herval Rossano. In 1986, she worked on the play Lily, Lily, which earned her acclaim and, in 1989, she founded the Teatro Israelita de Comédia, in order to produce and present the dramaturgy by Jewish authors. In 2003, she acted in Anton Chekhov's play Uncle Vanya, directed by Aderbal Freire Filho. In 2006, she was part of the cast of Rainha Esther, directed by Leon Góes. Between 2007 and 2009, she participated in 7, o Musical, her last work in theater, with Charles Möeller and Cláudio Botelho.

Cinema
Gomes made her cinematographic debut in 1963 in the film Bonitinha, mas Ordinária. She acted in other great successes such as O Mundo Alegre de Helô (1967), A Penúltima Donzela (1969), O Casal (1975), Copacabana (2001), and others.

Death
Gomes died on November 22, 2009, victim of cardiac arrest, a consequence of pneumonia, at the age of 85 and after a 65-year-long career, at the Hospital Samaritano in Rio de Janeiro. She was buried in São João de Meriti. Ida Gomes had already been selected as the great honoree at the 21st edition of the Shell Prize for Theater in Rio de Janeiro, for her longstanding contribution to the Brazilian theater. According to her relatives, she was happily preparing her thanksgiving speech.

Family
She was the sister of the Brazilian actor Felipe Wagner and aunt of the Brazilian actress Debora Olivieri and the musician Daniel Szafran.

Career

Television

Cinematography

Theater

Dubbing
 All movies by Joan Crawford presented in Brazil
 All movies by Bette Davis presented in Brazil
 Irmã Maria Teresa Vauzous (Gladys Cooper) in The Song of Bernadette
 Madame Medusa (Geraldine Page) in The Rescuers
 Madame Min (Martha Wentworth) in The Sword in the Stone
 Aunt Sponge (Miriam Margolyes) in James and the Giant Peach

References

20th-century Polish Jews
Polish emigrants to Brazil
Brazilian actresses
1923 births
2009 deaths